Musanze Football Club is an association football club based in Musanze, Rwanda. The team currently competes in the Rwanda National Football League, and plays its home games at the Ubworoherane Football Stadium.

References

External links
www.musanzefc.com Soccerway
Musanze F.C Official Website

Football clubs in Rwanda